Protopannaria is a genus of seven species of lichenized fungi in the family Pannariaceae. The genus was originally circumscribed as a subgenus of the genus Pannaria by Hungarian lichenologist Vilmos Kőfaragó-Gyelnik. Per Magnus Jørgensen and Stefan Ekman promoted Protopannaria to full status as a genus in 2000.

Species
Protopannaria alcicornis 
Protopannaria austro-orcadensis 
Protopannaria azorellae 
Protopannaria campbellensis 
Protopannaria corticola 
Protopannaria hilaris 
Protopannaria pezizoides

References

Peltigerales
Lichen genera
Peltigerales genera
Taxa described in 2000
Taxa named by Vilmos Kőfaragó-Gyelnik